The UEFA European Women's Under-17 Championship or simply UEFA Women's Under-17 Championship, is a European championship football tournament, organized by UEFA, for national teams of women under age seventeen. The tournament was first played out in 2007–08, having been approved by the UEFA Executive Committee on 22 May 2006. It is also a FIFA U-17 Women’s World Cup qualifying competition in even years. National under-17 teams whose countries belong to the European governing body UEFA can register to enter the competition. Germany is the most successful team in this competition, having won eight titles. Germany are the current champions.

Format
After two qualifying rounds, open to all eligible nations, four teams qualify for the final stage. They face in the semi-finals, with the winners contesting the final.

In 2011 it was announced, that the tournament will be expanded to eight teams and beginning with the 2014 edition the eight qualified teams play round-robin in two groups of four.

Results
Below are the results history table. 

Key:
pen–after penalty shootout

Winners

Comprehensive team results by tournament
Legend
 – Champions
 – Runners-up
 – Third place
 – Fourth place
 – Semi-finalists
GS – Group Stage (from 2014 onwards)
 – Did not qualify 
 – Did not enter / Withdrew
q – Qualified for upcoming tournament
 — Hosts

For each tournament, the number of teams in each finals tournament (in brackets) are shown.

Golden Player by tournament
SFor certain tournaments, the official website UEFA.com chose a Golden Player.

Number of teams

See also  
FIFA Women's World Cup
FIFA U-17 Women's World Cup
FIFA U-20 Women's World Cup
UEFA Women's Under-19 Championship
UEFA Women's Championship
UEFA Women's Champions League

Notes

References

External links
UEFA.com; official website

 
UEFA competitions for women's national teams
Under-17 association football
European youth sports competitions
Recurring sporting events established in 2008
2008 establishments in Europe